John Paterson may refer to:

Politics
John Paterson (New York politician) (1744–1808), American soldier and politician
John E. Paterson (1800–?), New York politician
John Paterson (Cape politician) (1822–1880), politician and businessman of the Cape Colony
John Paterson (Australian politician) (1831–1871), Australian politician in the New South Wales Legislative Assembly
John Guthrie Paterson (1902–1986), Australian politician in the New South Wales Legislative Council
Sir John Paterson, 3rd Baronet (c. 1730–1782), British politician

Religion
John Paterson (bishop of Ross) (1604–1679), father of the archbishop of Glasgow
John Paterson (archbishop of Glasgow) (1632–1708), Bishop of Galloway, Bishop of Edinburgh
John Paterson (missionary) (1776–1855), Scottish missionary in Scandinavia and the Russian Empire
John Paterson (priest) (1938–2005), Anglican Dean of Christ Church Cathedral, Dublin
John Paterson (bishop of Auckland) (born 1945), bishop of the Anglican Diocese of Auckland
John M. K. Paterson (1922–2009), Scottish minister

Sports
John Paterson (footballer) (born 1896), Scottish footballer
Jock Paterson (1926–2000), Scottish footballer
Jackie Paterson (1920–1966), Scottish boxer

Other
John Paterson, Scottish biscuit baker, founder of the Royal Burgh Bakery
John Paterson (architect) (died 1832), Scottish architect
John Ford Paterson (1851–1912), Scottish–Australian artist
John Johnstone Paterson (1886–1971), Hong Kong businessman and politician
John Jardine Paterson (1920–2000), Scottish businessman
John Ligertwood Paterson (1820-1882), Scottish medical doctor known for working in Bahia, Brazil
Jack Paterson (born 1974), Canadian actor

See also
John Patterson (disambiguation)